Zsuzsa Máthé (born May 4, 1964) is a Hungarian artist.
Her first exhibit opened in 1983, when she was age 18, entitled The First Exhibit of Transrealism.

By the age of 21 she extensively visited most countries in Europe, from communist Russia to the UK where she obtained qualifications to be able to start up one of the first privately owned English language schools of Budapest.

Art
Zsuzsa Máthé is one of the modern painters of the New Wave internationally. Her arts had been exhibited in Budapest, Hungary and various galleries around Israel.

Her works are often considered as a pre-runner to the Goth subculture so popular today.  New Romantic (1984), The Entry of Sedah (1986),  Sailor and Madonna (1986)  ,  Wo bist du? (1987) are some of the most characteristic works of this genre.

Exhibitions
 The First Exhibition of Transrealism — April 1984, Cultural Center Kada, Budapest, Hungary
 The Gates of Within and Beyond—November, 1984, Eötvös Lóránd University, Budapest, Hungary
 Withdrawn Promises -- February 1985 Eötvös Lóránd University, Budapest, Hungary
 Exchange Group (Exchange-series Philosophical ArtForwardAcademy) March 1–8. 1985. - Young Artists Club, Budapest,  
 La Malade Imaginaire -- April 1987 Eötvös Lóránd University, Budapest, Hungary
 Georges Cziffra pianist master course, joint exhibit, Keszthely, June, 1987 - Castle Festetics
 Shipwreck -- November, 1987, Cultural Center Mayakovskij, Budapest, Hungary,
 World Art Expo 2009, June, 2009 Orange County, CA, USA (honorable mention)
 Retrospect Gallery DunaPart, WestEnd City Center, Budapest, June, 2009
 Joint exhibit at the Grand Salon des Arts Gallery, Laguna Bearch, USA, August - October, 2009
 Joint exhibit on the XX. Biennial of Humour and Satire, Museum of Humour and Satire, Gabrovo, Bulgaria, May - September, 2011. representing Hungary

References
 Tájoló, (April 9–15, 1987, KISZ Budapesti Universitas Bizottsága p5.)
 Emotion: New Psychosocial Perspectives'' Edited by Shelley Day-Sclater, David Jones, Heather Price and Candida Yates, Palgrave-Macmillan 2009, cover image

Media
 

1964 births
Living people
Artists from Budapest
Bezalel Academy of Arts and Design alumni
Hungarian painters
20th-century Hungarian women artists
21st-century Hungarian women artists